Fatmir Frashëri (1941–2019) was an Albanian former football player who played for 17 Nëntori Tirana, Partizani and the Albania national team.

International career
He made his debut for Albania in a June 1963 European Championship qualification match away against Denmark and earned a total of 12 caps, scoring no goals. His final international was a October 1970 European Championship qualification match against Poland.

International statistics
Source:

Managerial career
Following his retirement in 1972 he became the head coach of 17 Nëntori Tirana, Naftëtari Qyteti Stalin, Besa Kavajë and Dinamo Tirana.

Honours

Player
Partizani
Albanian National Championship (2): 1962–63, 1963–64
Tirana
Albanian National Championship (4): 1964–65, 1965–66, 1968, 1969–70

Manager
Tirana
Albanian National Championship (1): 2002–03
Albanian Cup (1): 1975–76, 1976–77

Dinamo
Albanian National Championship (1): 1985–86

References

External links

1939 births
Living people
Footballers from Tirana
Albanian footballers
Albania international footballers
Association football defenders
KF Tirana players
FK Partizani Tirana players
Albanian football managers
KF Tirana managers
Naftëtari Kuçovë managers
Besa Kavajë managers
FK Dinamo Tirana managers
Kategoria Superiore players
Kategoria Superiore managers